Cristiano Doni (born 1 April 1973) is an Italian former professional footballer who played as an attacking midfielder, on either flank or in the middle.

Most of his professional career (which spanned two decades) was associated with Atalanta, as he played in more than 300 official games for the club and scored more than 100 goals. He amassed Serie A totals of 266 matches and 77 goals over the course of ten seasons, also representing in the competition Brescia and Sampdoria.

Doni appeared for Italy at the 2002 World Cup.

Club career
Born in Rome, Doni started playing professionally for Modena F.C. at age 18, subsequently moving on to A.C. Rimini 1912, A.C. Pistoiese and Bologna F.C. 1909.

He made his Serie A debut in 1997–98 for Brescia Calcio against Inter Milan, moving after two years to Bergamo with Atalanta BC. He quickly made a name for himself at the club with his hard-working style, combined with scoring ability, and netted in double digits in three out of five seasons.

After two seasons at U.C. Sampdoria, Doni had his first experience abroad aged 32, signing with Spain's RCD Mallorca. After just one season, he returned to his main team even though he had another year running at the Balearic Islands side, asking to be released so he could accept Atalanta's offer although he took a pay cut in the process.

Doni eventually signed a two-year contract, then proceeded to continue, in spite of his age, to be an indispensable offensive unit – 34 league goals in his first three years combined – as well as team captain. In 2010–11 the 37-year-old scored 12 Serie B goals as Atalanta returned to the top division after one year, as champions.

On 9 August 2011, Doni was banned from football for  years for his role in match fixing during the campaign, effectively ending his career at the age of 38. On 19 December, he was arrested together with 16 other people in connection with another match-fixing and betting investigation.

International career
Doni played seven times for Italy, the first cap arriving on 7 November 2001 as he found the net in a 1–1 friendly with Japan. Subsequently, he was picked for the squad at the 2002 FIFA World Cup by manager Giovanni Trapattoni, making two starting appearances throughout the tournament, the opening 2–0 win against Ecuador and the subsequent 2–1 defeat to Croatia where he provided the assist for Christian Vieri.

Style of play
Doni was known for his vision, technical ability and creativity as an offensive midfield playmaker. He was capable of scoring and assisting alike, due to his powerful and accurate mid-range shot.

Honours
Bologna
Serie C1: 1994–95
Serie B: 1995–96

Brescia
Serie B: 1996–97

Atalanta
Serie B: 2010–11

Individual
Premio Nazionale Carriera Esemplare "Gaetano Scirea": 2009

References

External links

National team data  

1973 births
Living people
Footballers from Rome
Italian footballers
Association football midfielders
Serie A players
Serie B players
Serie C players
Modena F.C. players
Rimini F.C. 1912 players
U.S. Pistoiese 1921 players
Bologna F.C. 1909 players
Brescia Calcio players
Atalanta B.C. players
U.C. Sampdoria players
La Liga players
RCD Mallorca players
Italy international footballers
2002 FIFA World Cup players
Italian expatriate footballers
Expatriate footballers in Spain
Italian expatriate sportspeople in Spain